M. T. Raju was an Indian politician. He was a Member of Parliament, representing Narasapuram in the Lok Sabha, the lower house of India's Parliament, as a member of the Indian National Congress.

References

External links
Official biographical sketch in Parliament of India website

Lok Sabha members from Andhra Pradesh
Indian National Congress politicians
India MPs 1971–1977
1911 births
Year of death missing